Miss April is a 1963 Danish family film directed by Finn Henriksen and starring Malene Schwartz.

Cast
Malene Schwartz as Frk. April Bergen
Ove Sprogøe as Lægeforsker Vagn Jochumsen
Poul Reichhardt as Dr. Gert Stiger
Lily Broberg as Sygeplejerske Inge Behrens
Hans W. Petersen as Konsul Gorm Andersen
Jessie Rindom as Erna Bergen
Bodil Udsen as Fru Rasmussen
Karl Stegger as Chauffør Poul Nielsen
Knud Hallest as Dahl
Inge Ketti as Frk. Børgesen
Arthur Jensen as Fiskehandler
Helle Hertz as Fabrikant Kronager
Valsø Holm as Godsejer Kransby
Bjørn Puggaard-Müller as Lord Edward Hopebatten
Bent Mejding as Dr. Ioskue
Bent Thalmay as Dr. Madsen
Alexander Notara as Giniescu
Lili Heglund

References

External links

1963 films
Danish children's films
1960s Danish-language films
Films directed by Finn Henriksen